José Gomes (born 14 July 1954) is a Portuguese judoka. He competed in the men's lightweight event at the 1976 Summer Olympics.

References

1954 births
Living people
Portuguese male judoka
Olympic judoka of Portugal
Judoka at the 1976 Summer Olympics
Place of birth missing (living people)
20th-century Portuguese people